The 1983 Tour de France was the 70th edition of Tour de France, one of cycling's Grand Tours. The Tour began in Fontenay-sous-Bois with a prologue individual time trial on 1 July and Stage 12 occurred on 12 July with a flat stage from Fleurance. The race finished on the Champs-Élysées in Paris on 24 July.

Stage 12
13 July 1983 — Fleurance to Roquefort-sur-Soulzon,

Stage 13
14 July 1983 — Roquefort-sur-Soulzon to Aurillac,

Stage 14
15 July 1983 — Aurillac to Issoire,

Stage 15
16 July 1983 — Clermont-Ferrand to Puy de Dôme,  (individual time trial)

Stage 16
17 July 1983 — Issoire to Saint-Étienne,

Stage 17
18 July 1983 — La Tour-du-Pin to Alpe d'Huez,

Stage 18
20 July 1983 — Le Bourg-d'Oisans to Morzine,

Stage 19
21 July 1983 — Morzine to Avoriaz,  (individual time trial)

Stage 20
22 July 1983 — Morzine to Dijon,

Stage 21
23 July 1983 — Dijon to Dijon,  (individual time trial)

Stage 22
24 July 1983 — Alfortville to Paris Champs-Élysées,

Notes

References

1983 Tour de France
Tour de France stages